Dhorka is a village in Gurgaon district and the eponymous tehsil in the Indian state of Haryana. It is one of 38 villages in Gurgaon Block. Garhi Harsaru and Patli railway stations are nearby.

Dhorka is surrounded by Gurgaon Tehsil (east), Pataudi Tehsil (west), Taoru Tehsil (south).

References

Villages in Gurgaon district